Involution is a 2018 Russian science fiction thriller film directed by Pavel Khvaleev.

Plot
A future where reality is significantly different, and where the earth is out of control, affected by a cruel and inhuman mechanism that turns back Darwin's theory of Evolution.

Cast
 Dennis Hurley as Ian
 Ryan Masson as Hamming
 Adam Giannone as Cain
 Alyona Konstantinova as Liv
 Merlin Leonhardt as Aaron
 Karsten Mielke as Taxi Driver

Production
The filming began in April, 2017.

References

External links 

2010s science fiction thriller films
Russian science fiction thriller films
2018 films